Yegoryevka is a rural locality (a selo) in Novopetrovsky Selsoviet of Blagoveshchensky District, Amur Oblast, Russia. The population was 183 as of 2018. There are 4 streets.

Geography 
Yegoryevka is located in the valley of the right bank of the Zeya River, 55 km north of Blagoveshchensk (the district's administrative centre) by road. Novinka is the nearest rural locality.

References 

Rural localities in Blagoveshchensky District, Amur Oblast